Leima Jagoi (literally, "Queen's dance" or "Dance of the Lairembi") is a dance form of the Meitei people of Manipur. It is adored with slow and gentle motions of the dancer. It is performed mainly in the religious festival of Lai Haraoba.
The dance form is traditionally performed in presence of royalty by noblewomen.
It is also presented by a group of village leishabis (maidens) after the Hoi Lauba ceremony.

The Leima Jagoi dance form is developed by the maibas (priests) and the maibis (priestesses) with the high level of artistic performance. Thus, it can hardly be classified as a folk dance form.

Related pages 

 Maibi Jagoi

References

Other websites 

 http://www.manipur.org/news/tag/leima-jagoi/
 http://www.e-pao.net/epGallery.asp?id=1&src=Arts_Dances/Manipuri_Dance_Gallery/JNMDA201804_1
 http://www.e-pao.net/epGallery.asp?id=1&src=Arts_Dances/LaiHaraoba/KhunthokLeima20160515
 http://www.e-pao.net/epGallery.asp?id=4&src=Festival/SangaiFestival/Day4Leima20171125
 http://www.e-pao.net/epGallery.asp?id=22&src=News_Related/Archived_News_Photo/NewsPhotoArchive_2015_6
 https://narthaki.com/info/rev07/rev470.html
Meitei culture
Pages with unreviewed translations
Dances of Manipur